Osmani International Airport  in Sylhet, Bangladesh, is the third largest airport in Bangladesh after Dhaka and Chittagong. The airport is operated by the Civil Aviation Authority, Bangladesh (CAAB) and is served by Biman Bangladesh Airlines, the national airline, which at one point earned most of its revenue from this airport. Private airlines Novoair and US-Bangla Airlines operate domestic flights to Dhaka.

History 

Osmani International Airport was built during the British rule of the Indian Subcontinent, partly to check Japanese aggression from Burma . The airport was formerly known as Sylhet Civil Airport but was renamed after General M A G Osmani, Commander in Chief of Independence War of Bangladesh as well as of Muktijuddho in 1971. 

The airport was initially served by domestic flights from Shahjalal International Airport by the country's national airline Biman Bangladesh Airlines . After many years of lobbying by expatriates living in the UK, limited expansion of the airport was carried out to enable medium-sized aircraft, such as the Airbus A310 used by Biman, to operate . The work was completed in October 2002 and the airport was designated an international airport by the government . However, the airport was not up to international standards to be capable of fully accommodating international flights due to many shortcomings with the instrument landing system and runway lighting system, and the designation was seen as a move to stave off pressure by the government.

Nevertheless, on 3 November 2002, the airport received its first international arrival . Biman flight BG020 from Kuwait via Abu Dhabi landed at 10:05 with 215 passengers en route to Dhaka. The disembarking passengers on the inaugural flight were greeted by then Finance & Planning Minister, M Saifur Rahman and State Minister for Civil Aviation and Tourism, Mir Mohammad Nasiruddin . For a brief period, Biman also operated a direct service from London but was later re-routed via Dhaka.

Additional expansion of the runway and improvements to the runway lighting and airport facilities were commenced in 2004 to enable wide-bodied aircraft to safely land and takeoff from the airport.

The South Asia Transport and Trade Facilitation Conference report of 2006 (by the United States Trade and Development Agency) noted that the development of the airport "up to the standards of [an] international airport" to "encourage private sector participation in air transport" were projects that were under consideration by the government.

Work started in 2006 to upgrade the terminal facilities to enable handling of international flights . The improvements include construction of a new terminal building, two Jetways and a taxi-way. In May 2007, the foreign affairs adviser, informed journalists that the works were on scheduled for completion in June 2007. He also confirmed that Biman will be operating Hajj flights directly from the airport during the Hajj season later in 2007. However, the runway expansion works had not been completed in June with the foreign affairs adviser indicating in August that "minor dressing work" still remained. The work was finally finished in December 2008.

In 2010 the decision was made to construct a refueling station. Construction work began in January 2012. In January 2014 the Project Director Aminul Haq stated that the project was 70% complete.

On 1 April 2015, Flydubai resumed foreign airline service to Sylhet with its flight from Dubai–International. Flydubai's introduction of nonstop flights from Dubai became the first international flights to Sylhet since the airport's "international" designation 18 years prior . The service was operated through a codeshare agreement with Bangladeshi airline Regent Airways. However, because Biman Bangladesh Airlines had refused to provide ground handling services, the route was cancelled the next day. Stranded passengers held a demonstration in response on 6 April 2015. In November 2016, Flydubai decided to start its flight again from Sylhet to the Middle East. This flight was ended on 7 September 2018

In November 2020, US-Bangla Airlines started operating flight to Muscat, becoming first Bangladeshi private airlines to operate international flights from Sylhet.
On 12 November 2020, Biman Bangladesh Airlines started flight between Sylhet to Cox's Bazar, which was in a first, a direct flight between two domestic airports without any connecting flight from Dhaka.
Later in March 2021, Biman started another direct flight between Chittagong and Sylhet, considering the demand of passengers for domestic tourism and commercial purposes.

After completion of runway strengthening works (2021), the long standing demand for both outbound and inbound direct flights to and from the UK has been fulfilled. As of January 2022, Biman was operating 4 weekly  roundtrip Dreamliner flights to London and 2 weekly roundtrip Dreamliner flights to Manchester, from Sylhet. These flights all originate and terminate in Dhaka.            

On October 24, 2022, Biman started operating a weekly flight from Sylhet non-stop to Jeddah. On November 1, 2022, Biman started operating a weekly flight from Sylhet non-stop to Sharjah. Both these flight originate in Dhaka and follow the same route on the way back the next day. There is also currently a weekly Biman flight to Dubai from Sylhet. This flight originates and terminates in Dhaka.

Expansion and development

Post completion of the new terminal building the passenger capacity of the airport will be upgraded to 2 million per annum from the current capacity of 600,000 per annum. There will be six boarding bridges and thirty six check in counters in the new terminal building.

Airlines and destinations

Passenger

Cargo

Accidents and incidents
 On 22 December 1997, Biman Bangladesh Airlines flight BG-609 carrying 85 passengers and 4 crew, operated by a Fokker F28-4000, crashed onto a paddy field 5.6 kilometres from the foot of the runway in heavy fog, on final approach from Dhaka. 17 passengers were injured.
 On 8 October 2004, Biman Bangladesh Airlines flight BG-601 carrying 79 passengers and 4 crew, operated by a Fokker F28-4000, inbound from Dhaka overran the wet runway and ended up in a ditch. Two passengers were injured.

See also
 List of airports in Bangladesh

References

Citations

Bibliography

External links

 Aviation Safety Network: Sylhet Civil Airport
 Civil Aviation Authority of Bangladesh: Airports
 Live Flight Status

International airports in Bangladesh
Airfields of the United States Army Air Forces in British India
Aviation in Bangladesh
Transport in Sylhet